The 1969–70 Libyan Premier League was the 6th edition of the competition since its inception in 1963.

Overview
Al-Ahly Benghazi won the championship.

Final
Al-Ahly Tripoli 1-2 ; 1-2 Al-Ahly Benghazi
Al-Ahly Benghazi won the championship.

References
Libya - List of final tables (RSSSF)

Libyan Premier League seasons
Libya
Premier League